Yaromjeh Bagh (also Romanized as Yāromjeh Bāgh, Yāramjah Bāgh, and Yāremjeh Bāgh; also known as Yaramjābak and Yārmjeh Bolāgh) is a village in Boghrati Rural District, Sardrud District, Razan County, Hamadan Province, Iran. At the 2006 census, its population was 688, in 138 families.

References 

Populated places in Razan County